This is a list of defunct airlines of Asia.

Afghanistan

Armenia

Azerbaijan

Bahrain
Defunct airlines of Bahrain include:

Bangladesh

Brunei
Defunct airlines of Brunei include:

Cambodia

China, People's Republic of

Hong Kong

Macau
Defunct airlines of Macau include:

Manchukuo
Defunct airlines of Manchukuo include:

East Timor
Defunct airlines of East Timor include:

Georgia

India

Indonesia

Iran

Iraq

Israel

Japan

Jordan

Kazakhstan

Korea, North
Defunct airlines of North Korea include:

Korea, South

Kuwait
Defunct airlines of Kuwait include:

Kyrgyzstan

Laos

Lebanon

Malaysia

Maldives

Mongolia
Defunct airlines of Mongolia include:

Myanmar

Nepal

Pakistan

Palestine

Philippines

Qatar

Saudi Arabia

Singapore

Sri Lanka

Syria
Defunct airlines of Syria include:

Taiwan (officially Republic of China)

Tajikistan

Thailand

United Arab Emirates

Uzbekistan
Defunct airlines of Uzbekistan include:

Vietnam

Yemen

See also
 List of airlines of Asia

References

Asia

 Defunct
Airlines, defunct